Impulse is an American science fiction drama television series based on the 2013 Steven Gould novel Impulse. The novel was one of a series following Gould's novel Jumper. The series is a loose sequel to the 2008 film adaptation of the book.

The series premiered on June 6, 2018, on YouTube Premium. It is executive produced by Lauren LeFranc, Doug Liman, David Bartis, and Gene Klein. LeFranc also acted as showrunner for the series. In July 2018, the series was renewed for a second season consisting of ten episodes, which premiered on October 16, 2019. The series was canceled in March 2020.

Premise
Impulse follows 16-year-old Henrietta "Henry" Coles who discovers she has the ability to teleport but has no control over her destination. The first time she realizes this, she is in a truck with her high school's basketball captain and star, Clay Boone, who tries to rape her. She has a seizure and teleports, in the course of which she inadvertently crushes much of his truck when her ability to teleport first manifests, leaving him a paraplegic. The show then explores Henry's feelings of fear regarding the assault, and the discovery that those feelings can trigger her ability to teleport.

Cast and characters

Main
 Maddie Hasson as Henrietta "Henry" Coles, a teenage girl who possesses the ability to teleport, though has no control over her destination initially. She first realizes she has this capability while in the middle of being sexually assaulted. Her powers activate through emotional distress. She eventually is taught to control her powers by a fellow teleporter.
 Carina Battrick portrays a younger Henry Coles in a supporting role.
Sarah Desjardins as Jenna Faith Hope, Henry's soon-to-be stepsister and confidante. Initially cold and distant towards Henry, she becomes closer to her upon discovering that she was sexually assaulted. She soon begins questioning her sexuality.
 Enuka Okuma as Anna Hulce, a deputy sheriff in Reston, investigating the incident which left Clay Boone physically disabled for life via his legs. She eventually witnesses a man teleporting away right before her eyes and confronts Henry about it, who teleports her to a cave.
 Craig Arnold as Lucas Boone, a local mechanic, drug trafficker, and the eldest son of car and drug dealer Bill Boone. After spending time with the Millers and learning their religious ways, he returns to Reston and declares his unwavering devotion and allegiance to Henry as penance for what his father and brother put her through. 
 Tanner Stine as Clay Boone, a star of the local basketball team and Bill Boone's youngest son. A classmate of Henry's, Clay develops an interest in her when she begins attending school. While making out in his truck, he attempts to rape her. The assault causes her latent ability to teleport to activate, resulting in her having a seizure and teleporting away out of self-preservation. The resulting spatial distortion of Henry's escape crushes much of Clay's truck and leaves him without the use of his legs. (main season 1, guest season 2)
 Keegan-Michael Key as Michael Pearce, a scientist at a gravitational wave detector. (season 1)
 Missi Pyle as Cleo Coles, Henry's mother. She is living with and dating Thomas Hope.
 Daniel Maslany as Townes Linderman, an autistic student at Reston High School who becomes close friends with Henry (recurring season 1, main season 2)
 Callum Keith Rennie as Nikolai (recurring season 1, main season 2), a master teleporter who was responsible for abducting Henrietta's father, Simon, ten years ago. He eventually mentors Henry on how to further develop and master her abilities fully.

Recurring

 Matt Gordon as Thomas Hope, Jenna's father. He and Cleo Coles live together with their daughters. 
 David James Elliott as Bill Boone, a local car dealer who also traffics in drugs. He is Lucas and Clay's father and Cleo Cole's boss.
 Genevieve Kang as Patty Yang, a cheerleader at Reston High School and Clay's ex-girlfriend. She breaks up with him after discovering that he had been cheating on her.
 Gabriel Darku as Zach Jaymes
 Will Chase as Simon, Henry's father
 Aidan Devine as Sheriff Dale
 Shawn Doyle as Jeremiah Miller
 Tara Rosling as Esther Miller
 Gordon Harper as Amos Miller
 Dylan Trowbridge as Matthew
 Angel Giuffria as Zoe, Townes' online girlfriend
 Keon Alexander as Dominick, a Francophone who also possesses the ability to teleport long distances
 Raphael Bergeron-Lapointe as Tristan, Dominick's six-year-old son
 Rohan Mead as Jason Munther
 Geoffrey Pounsett as Deputy Gabriel
 Paula Boudreau as Nurse Mary
 Michael Reventar as Luis Castillo
 Rachel Wilson as Iris
 Alex Paxton-Beesley as Sabine, Dominick's wife and Tristan's mother
 Steve Fifield as Eddie Max
 Catherine Burdon as Eileen Paige, the principal of Reston High School
 Christina Collins as Gale
 Jamal Brown as Quinn
 Julia Knope as Brenda Gasser
 Sam Kantor as Damian
 Kristian Bruun as Sheldon Gibson
 Sandra Flores as Mrs. Gerhard
 Duane Murray as Sam
 Lauren Collins as Meghan Linderman
 Amadeus Serafini as Josh
 Billy Otis as Gil
 Kevin Hanchard as Jack Weakley, a doctor who treats Henry after she suffers a seizure
 Elisa Moolecherry as Nora Barnes
 Michelle Nolden as Wendy Jacobson, Bill Boone's estranged ex-wife and Lucas and Clay's mother

Guest

 David Alpay as Daniel ("Treading Water")
 Lois Smith as Deidre Jones ("The Eagle and the Bee")
 Allison Hossack as Erica Wallace ("The Eagle and the Bee")
 Danny Pudi as Beanie ("They Know Not What They Do")
 Zack Pearlman as Glasses ("They Know Not What They Do")

Episodes

Season 1 (2018)

Season 2 (2019)

Production

Development
On December 15, 2016, YouTube commissioned a television pilot titled Impulse from a script by Jeffrey Lieber, with revisions by Gary Spinelli, loosely based on the novel by Steven Gould. It was to be produced by the production companies Hypnotic and Universal Cable Productions with Doug Liman, David Bartis, and Gene Klein of Hypnotic reported to be executive producers. Liman was also expected to direct the pilot as well.

On June 27, 2017, YouTube gave the production a series order with a premiere tentatively set for 2018. On January 13, 2018, producer/writer Lauren LeFranc joined the series in the position of showrunner and executive producer. On May 10, 2018, YouTube Red released the first official trailer and set the series premiere for June 6, 2018.

On July 19, 2018, the series was renewed for a second season consisting of ten episodes, which premiered on October 16, 2019. On March 10, 2020, it was announced that the series had been canceled.

Casting
Simultaneously with the announcement of the pilot order, it was confirmed that Maddie Hasson, Sarah Desjardins, Missi Pyle, Enuka Okuma, and Craig Arnold had been cast as series regulars. In addition, it was reported that David James Elliott would appear in the series in a main role.

Filming
Production for the pilot began in Toronto, Ontario, Canada on December 16, 2016. Filming continued in the Cayuga community in Haldimand County, Ontario at locations including Cayuga Secondary School, the Cayuga Administration Building, Haldimand Motors, Toronto Motorsports Park, a resident's farm, as well as many other facilities. On January 13, 2017, the production filmed an accident scene on Kohler Road in Cayuga. On October 13, 2017, filming for a portion of the rest of the series took place in the Carlisle community of Hamilton, Ontario. Filming for the second season took place from February 21 to June 14, 2019, in Toronto.

Release

Marketing
On March 24, 2018, the show hosted a panel at the annual WonderCon fan convention in Anaheim, California. It was moderated by IGNs Laura Prudom and featured executive producers Liman and Gene Klein, showrunner Lauren LeFranc and actors Maddie Hasson, Missi Pyle, and Daniel Maslany. On May 30, 2018, YouTube made the first episode available to those owning a Google Assistant. From June 5–7, 2018, YouTube employed the use of viral marketing with the assistance of popular YouTube creators Kendall Rae, Karina Garcia, Cam's Creations, Nichole Jacklyne, Ayydubs, and Jacksfilms. During the span of those days, the content creators embedded footage of Keon Alexander's character Dominick from the series teleporting into and out of their videos.

Premiere
On June 7, 2018, the series held its official premiere at the Roxy Cinema in New York City. The premiere included a screening followed by a question and answer session featuring executive producer Doug Liman and lead actress Maddie Hasson.

Reception
The first season was met with a positive response from critics upon its premiere. On the review aggregation website Rotten Tomatoes, the first season holds a 100% approval rating with an average rating of 6.70 out of 10 based on 9 reviews.

Notes

References

External links
 
 

Jumper (novel)
2010s American science fiction television series
2010s American teen drama television series
2010s American LGBT-related drama television series
2018 American television series debuts
2019 American television series endings
American action television series
English-language television shows
YouTube Premium original series
Television shows based on American novels
Television shows filmed in Hamilton, Ontario
Television shows filmed in Toronto
Television shows set in New York (state)
American science fiction web series
Television series about teenagers
Television series by Universal Content Productions